The 2019–20 Orlando Magic season was the 31st season of the franchise in the National Basketball Association (NBA). On March 11, 2020, the NBA suspended play of the entire league indefinitely due to the COVID-19 pandemic. On June 4, 2020, the NBA Board of Governors approved a restart plan to resume the season on July 30, with approval from the National Basketball Players Association the next day. As a result, the Magic were one of 22 teams that were invited to play eight games each in the NBA Bubble at the ESPN Wide World of Sports Complex at Walt Disney World in Orlando, Florida. The games, which were closed to the public, counted towards the regular season to determine the seeding for the 2020 NBA playoffs.

On August 8, a loss by the Washington Wizards secured the Magic a playoff berth for the second season in a row. As the eighth seed in the Eastern Conference, the Magic drew top seeded Milwaukee Bucks in the first round of the 2020 NBA playoffs. On August 26, with the Magic facing elimination, the fifth game of the series was postponed as a result of the Milwaukee Bucks boycott in response to the shooting of Jacob Blake. This ultimately resulted in a brief suspension of the entire NBA playoffs. In the days following, games in several other leagues were postponed as players refused to play in solidarity in order to bring further awareness to the Black Lives Matter movement. When game five was eventually played, the Magic lost, ending their season.

As of 2022, this season marked the last time the Magic made the playoffs.

Draft picks

The Orlando Magic had one first and second-round draft pick. The 46th pick would then be traded to the Los Angeles Lakers.

Roster

Standings

Division

Conference

Game log

Preseason

|- style="background:#cfc;"
| 1
| October 5
| @ San Antonio
| 
| Mo Bamba (18)
| Bamba, Carter-Williams, Birch (6)
| Al-Farouq Aminu (5)
| AT&T Center14,123
| 1–0
|- style="background:#cfc;"
| 2
| October 7
| @ Detroit
| 
| Aaron Gordon (25)
| Nikola Vučević (10)
| Markelle Fultz (7)
| Little Caesars Arena14,471
| 2–0
|- style="background:#cfc;"
| 3
| October 9
| @ Atlanta
| 
| Terrence Ross (20)
| Aminu, Isaac (8)
| Isaac, Ross, Carter-Williams (4)
| State Farm Arena10,945
| 3–0
|- style="background:#fcc;"
| 4
| October 11
| Boston
| 
| Terrence Ross (21)
| Mo Bamba (7)
| Markelle Fultz (4)
| Amway Center17,354
| 3–1
|- style="background:#fcc;"
| 5
| October 13
| Philadelphia
| 
| Mo Bamba (12)
| Gordon, Isaac (6)
| D. J. Augustin (6)
| Amway Center16,819
| 3–2
|- style="background:#fcc;"
| 6
| October 17
| Miami
| 
| Nikola Vučević (16)
| Nikola Vučević (6)
| Fournier, Magette (4)
| Amway Center17,149
| 3–3

Regular season

|- style="background:#cfc;"
| 1
| October 23
| Cleveland
| 
| Nikola Vučević (21)
| Nikola Vučević (10)
| Markelle Fultz (6)
| Amway Center18,846
| 1–0
|- style="background:#fcc;"
| 2
| October 26
| @ Atlanta
| 
| Evan Fournier (23)
| Nikola Vučević (10)
| D. J. Augustin (4)
| State Farm Arena17,078
| 1–1
|- style="background:#fcc;"
| 3
| October 28
| @ Toronto
| 
| Jonathan Isaac (24)
| Nikola Vučević (12)
| Fultz, Gordon (5)
| Scotiabank Arena19,800
| 1–2
|- style="background:#cfc;"
| 4
| October 30
| New York
| 
| Nikola Vučević (21)
| Nikola Vučević (13)
| D. J. Augustin (7)
| Amway Center17,456
| 2–2

|- style="background:#fcc;"
| 5
| November 1
| Milwaukee
| 
| Evan Fournier (19)
| Nikola Vučević (7)
| D. J. Augustin (6)
| Amway Center15,105
| 2–3
|- style="background:#fcc;"
| 6
| November 2
| Denver
| 
| Nikola Vučević (24)
| Al-Farouq Aminu (10)
| Evan Fournier (5)
| Amway Center17,025
| 2–4
|- style="background:#fcc;"
| 7
| November 5
| @ Oklahoma City
| 
| Aaron Gordon (15)
| Nikola Vučević (11)
| Markelle Fultz (4)
| Chesapeake Energy Arena18,203
| 2–5
|- style="background:#fcc;"
| 8
| November 6
| @ Dallas
| 
| Aaron Gordon (23)
| Nikola Vučević (11)
| Nikola Vučević (7)
| American Airlines Center19,487
| 2–6
|- style="background:#cfc;"
| 9
| November 8
| Memphis
| 
| Nikola Vučević (23)
| Nikola Vučević (16)
| Vučević, Fournier (6)
| Amway Center17,021
| 3–6
|- style="background:#fcc;"
| 10
| November 10
| Indiana
| 
| Evan Fournier (22)
| Nikola Vučević (17)
| Augustin, Fournier (6)
| Amway Center17,118
| 3–7
|- style="background:#cfc;"
| 11
| November 13
| Philadelphia
| 
| Nikola Vučević (25)
| Aaron Gordon (13)
| D. J. Augustin (8)
| Amway Center15,113
| 4–7
|- style="background:#cfc;"
| 12
| November 15
| San Antonio
| 
| Evan Fournier (26)
| Aminu, Vučević (13)
| Augustin, Fultz, Gordon, Vučević (4)
| Amway Center16,296
| 5–7
|- style="background:#cfc;"
| 13
| November 17
| Washington
| 
| Nikola Vučević (30)
| Nikola Vučević (17)
| Evan Fournier (9)
| Amway Center16,344
| 6–7
|- style="background:#fcc;"
| 14
| November 20
| @ Toronto
| 
| Evan Fournier (21)
| Jonathan Isaac (13)
| Augustin, Vučević (5)
| Scotiabank Arena19,800
| 6–8
|- style="background:#fcc;"
| 15
| November 23
| @ Indiana
| 
| Evan Fournier (26)
| Jonathan Isaac (9)
| Markelle Fultz (9)
| Bankers Life Fieldhouse16,446
| 6–9
|- style="background:#fcc;"
| 16
| November 25
| @ Detroit
| 
| Terrence Ross (19)
| Mo Bamba (12)
| D. J. Augustin (5)
| Little Caesars Arena14,695
| 6–10
|- style="background:#cfc;"
| 17
| November 27
| @ Cleveland
| 
| Evan Fournier (30)
| Jonathan Isaac (7)
| D. J. Augustin (10)
| Rocket Mortgage FieldHouse17,712
| 7–10
|- style="background:#fcc;"
| 18
| November 29
| Toronto
| 
| Evan Fournier (19)
| Khem Birch (12)
| Evan Fournier (6)
| Amway Center17,014
| 7–11

|- style="background:#cfc;"
| 19
| December 1
| Golden State
| 
| Evan Fournier (32)
| Jonathan Isaac (11)
| Markelle Fultz (9)
| Amway Center15,052
| 8–11
|- style="background:#cfc;"
| 20
| December 3
| @ Washington
| 
| Evan Fournier (31)
| Aaron Gordon (11)
| Markelle Fultz (6)
| Capital One Arena13,159
| 9–11
|- style="background:#cfc;"
| 21
| December 4
| Phoenix
| 
| Aaron Gordon (32)
| Mo Bamba (11)
| D. J. Augustin (7)
| Amway Center15,176
| 10–11
|- style="background:#cfc;"
| 22
| December 6
| @ Cleveland
| 
| Terrence Ross (21)
| Michael Carter-Williams (7)
| D. J. Augustin (7)
| Rocket Mortgage FieldHouse18,446
| 11–11
|- style="background:#fcc;"
| 23
| December 9
| @ Milwaukee
| 
| Evan Fournier (26)
| Aaron Gordon (13)
| Markelle Fultz (9)
| Fiserv Forum17,385
| 11–12
|- style="background:#fcc;"
| 24
| December 11
| L. A. Lakers
| 
| Jonathan Isaac (19)
| Aaron Gordon (14)
| Michael Carter-Williams (6)
| Amway Center18,846
| 11–13
|- style="background:#fcc;"
| 25
| December 13
| Houston
| 
| Evan Fournier (27)
| Bamba, Gordon (6)
| Augustin, Fultz (5)
| Amway Center16,335
| 11–14
|- style="background:#cfc;"
| 26
| December 15
| @ New Orleans
| 
| Jonathan Isaac (21)
| Jonathan Isaac (11)
| D. J. Augustin (8)
| Smoothie King Center15,388
| 12–14
|- style="background:#fcc;"
| 27
| December 17
| @ Utah
| 
| D. J. Augustin (22)
| Nikola Vučević (11)
| Fournier, Vučević (4)
| Vivint Smart Home Arena18,306
| 12–15
|- style="background:#fcc;"
| 28
| December 18
| @ Denver
| 
| Nikola Vučević (20)
| Vučević, Gordon (7)
| D. J. Augustin (7)
| Pepsi Center18,182
| 12–16
|- style="background:#fcc;"
| 29
| December 20
| @ Portland
| 
| Nikola Vučević (23)
| Nikola Vučević (12)
| Fultz, Gordon (4)
| Moda Center19,393
| 12–17
|- style="background:#cfc;"
| 30
| December 23
| Chicago
| 
| Terrence Ross (26)
| Aaron Gordon (11)
| Augustin, Isaac (5)
| Amway Center18,846
| 13–17
|- style="background:#cfc;"
| 31
| December 27
| Philadelphia
| 
| Evan Fournier (20)
| Nikola Vučević (12)
| Nikola Vučević (7)
| Amway Center17,311
| 14–17
|- style="background:#fcc;"
| 32
| December 28
| @ Milwaukee
| 
| Evan Fournier (23)
| Jonathan Isaac (9)
| Markelle Fultz (6)
| Fiserv Forum17,920
| 14–18
|- style="background:#fcc;"
| 33
| December 30
| Atlanta
| 
| Nikola Vučević (27)
| Jonathan Isaac (9)
| D. J. Augustin (6)
| Amway Center17,784
| 14–19

|- style="background:#cfc;"
| 34
| January 1
| @ Washington
| 
| D. J. Augustin (25)
| Nikola Vučević (12)
| D. J. Augustin (9)
| Capital One Arena14,921
| 15–19
|- style="background:#cfc;"
| 35
| January 3
| Miami
| 
| Terrence Ross (25)
| Bamba, Vučević (11)
| Augustin, Vučević (7)
| Amway Center17,198
| 16–19
|- style="background:#fcc;"
| 36
| January 4
| Utah
| 
| Terrence Ross (24)
| Nikola Vučević (13)
| Markelle Fultz (7)
| Amway Center16,913
| 16–20
|- style="background:#cfc;"
| 37
| January 6
| Brooklyn
| 
| Markelle Fultz (25)
| Nikola Vučević (24)
| D. J. Augustin (6)
| Amway Center15,008
| 17–20
|- style="background:#cfc;"
| 38
| January 8
| Washington
| 
| Nikola Vučević (29)
| Birch, Vučević (9)
| Markelle Fultz (7)
| Amway Center16,013
| 18–20
|- style="background:#fcc;"
| 39
| January 10
| @ Phoenix
| 
| Evan Fournier (28)
| Nikola Vučević (13)
| Markelle Fultz (6)
| Talking Stick Resort Arena14,562
| 18–21
|- style="background:#cfc;"
| 40
| January 13
| @ Sacramento
| 
| Nikola Vučević (26)
| Nikola Vučević (15)
| Evan Fournier (6)
| Golden 1 Center16,299
| 19–21
|- style="background:#cfc;"
| 41
| January 15
| @ L. A. Lakers
| 
| Fultz, Gordon (21)
| Fultz, Bamba (11)
| Markelle Fultz (10)
| Staples Center18,997
| 20–21
|- style="background:#fcc;"
| 42
| January 16
| @ L. A. Clippers
| 
| Nikola Vučević (22)
| Nikola Vučević (9)
| Fultz, Gordon (5)
| Staples Center19,068
| 20–22
|- style="background:#fcc;"
| 43
| January 18
| @ Golden State
| 
| Markelle Fultz (23)
| Nikola Vučević (13)
| Fournier, Fultz (4)
| Chase Center18,064
| 20–23
|- style="background:#cfc;"
| 44
| January 20
| @ Charlotte
| 
| Evan Fournier (26)
| Nikola Vučević (10)
| Aaron Gordon (7)
| Spectrum Center16,133
| 21–23
|- style="background:#fcc;"
| 45
| January 22
| Oklahoma City
| 
| Terrence Ross (26)
| Nikola Vučević (11)
| Fournier, Fultz (6)
| Amway Center18,846
| 21–24
|- style="background:#fcc;"
| 46
| January 24
| Boston
| 
| Evan Fournier (30)
| Nikola Vučević (12)
| Fultz, Vučević (4)
| Amway Center18,846
| 21–25
|- style="background:#fcc;"
| 47
| January 26
| L. A. Clippers
| 
| Michael Carter-Williams (15)
| Aaron Gordon (10)
| Michael Carter-Williams (8)
| Amway Center15,427
| 21–26
|- style="background:#fcc;"
| 48
| January 27
| @ Miami
| 
| Gordon, Vučević (13)
| Nikola Vučević (12)
| Evan Fournier (8)
| American Airlines Arena19,600
| 21–27

|- style="background:#fcc;"
| 49
| February 1
| Miami
| 
| Aaron Gordon (24)
| Nikola Vučević (9)
| Markelle Fultz (6)
| Amway Center18,846
| 21–28
|- style="background:#cfc;"
| 50
| February 3
| @ Charlotte
| 
| Nikola Vučević (22)
| Aaron Gordon (12)
| Markelle Fultz (14)
| Spectrum Center12,337
| 22–28
|- style="background:#fcc;"
| 51
| February 5
| @ Boston
| 
| Evan Fournier (26)
| Gordon, Vučević (10)
| Michael Carter-Williams (6)
| TD Garden19,156
| 22–29
|- style="background:#fcc;"
| 52
| February 6
| @ New York
| 
| Nikola Vučević (25)
| Nikola Vučević (8)
| Markelle Fultz (6)
| Madison Square Garden18,895
| 22–30
|- style="background:#fcc;"
| 53
| February 8
| Milwaukee
| 
| Nikola Vučević (21)
| Nikola Vučević (14)
| Carter-Williams, Vučević (6)
| Amway Center16,632
| 22–31
|- style="background:#cfc;"
| 54
| February 10
| Atlanta
| 
| Aaron Gordon (26)
| Gordon, Vučević (9)
| Nikola Vučević (9)
| Amway Center17,076
| 23–31
|- style="background:#cfc;"
| 55
| February 12
| Detroit
| 
| Aaron Gordon (25)
| Nikola Vučević (11)
| Markelle Fultz (10)
| Amway Center16,607
| 24–31
|- align="center"
|colspan="9" bgcolor="#bbcaff"|All-Star Break
|- style="background:#fcc;"
| 56
| February 21
| Dallas
| 
| Evan Fournier (28)
| Gordon, Vučević (12)
| Markelle Fultz (9)
| Amway Center18,846
| 24–32
|- style="background:#cfc;"
| 57
| February 24
| @ Brooklyn
| 
| Aaron Gordon (27)
| Gordon, Vučević (10)
| Markelle Fultz (7)
| Barclays Center16,162
| 25–32
|- style="background:#cfc;"
| 58
| February 26
| @ Atlanta
| 
| Evan Fournier (28)
| Nikola Vučević (12)
| Markelle Fultz (8)
| State Farm Arena14,967
| 26–32
|- style="background:#cfc;"
| 59
| February 28
| Minnesota
| 
| Terrence Ross (33)
| Aaron Gordon (11)
| Aaron Gordon (12)
| Amway Center18,846
| 27–32
|- style="background:#fcc;"
| 60
| February 29
| @ San Antonio
| 
| Evan Fournier (23)
| Nikola Vučević (9)
| D.J. Augustin (7)
| AT&T Center18,354
| 27–33

|- style="background:#fcc;"
| 61
| March 2
| Portland
| 
| Nikola Vučević (30)
| Nikola Vučević (11)
| Markelle Fultz (10)
| Amway Center18,078
| 27–34
|- style="background:#fcc;"
| 62
| March 4
| @ Miami
| 
| Terrence Ross (35)
| Nikola Vučević (16)
| Aaron Gordon (9)
| American Airlines Arena19,600
| 27–35
|- style="background:#cfc;"
| 63
| March 6
| @ Minnesota
| 
| Nikola Vučević (28)
| Nikola Vučević (12)
| Augustin, Fultz, Williams (5)
| Target Center14,315
| 28–35
|- style="background:#cfc;"
| 64
| March 8
| @ Houston
| 
| D.J. Augustin (24)
| Nikola Vučević (16)
| Markelle Fultz (5)
| Toyota Center18,055
| 29–35
|- style="background:#cfc;"
| 65
| March 10
| @ Memphis
| 
| Terrence Ross (24)
| Nikola Vučević (11)
| Aaron Gordon (9)
| FedExForum15,388
| 30–35

|- style="background:#cfc;"
| 66
| July 31
| @ Brooklyn
| 
| Evan Fournier (24)
| Aaron Gordon (11)
| Markelle Fultz (6)
| HP Field HouseNo in-person attendance
| 31–35
|- style="background:#cfc;"
| 67
| August 2
| Sacramento
| 
| Terrence Ross (25)
| Nikola Vučević (11)
| D. J. Augustin (8)
| HP Field HouseNo in-person attendance
| 32–35
|- style="background:#fcc;"
| 68
| August 4
| @ Indiana
| 
| Nikola Vučević (24)
| Nikola Vučević (10)
| D. J. Augustin (5)
| Visa Athletic CenterNo in-person attendance
| 32–36
|- style="background:#fcc;"
| 69
| August 5
| Toronto
| 
| Fournier, Ross (15)
| Aaron Gordon (11)
| Aaron Gordon (5)
| Visa Athletic CenterNo in-person attendance
| 32–37
|- style="background:#fcc;"
| 70
| August 7
| @ Philadelphia
| 
| Evan Fournier (22)
| Nikola Vučević (12)
| D. J. Augustin (5)
| HP Field HouseNo in-person attendance
| 32–38
|- style="background:#fcc;"
| 71
| August 9
| @ Boston
| 
| Nikola Vučević (26)
| Nikola Vučević (11)
| Markelle Fultz (10)
| The ArenaNo in-person attendance
| 32–39
|- style="background:#fcc;"
| 72
| August 11
| Brooklyn
| 
| Fultz, Iwundu (18)
| Nikola Vučević (10)
| Augustin, Iwundu (3)
| The ArenaNo in-person attendance
| 32–40
|- style="background:#cfc;"
| 73
| August 13
| New Orleans
| 
| Nikola Vučević (23)
| Nikola Vučević (6)
| Augustin, Iwundu (6)
| Visa Athletic CenterNo in-person attendance
| 33–40

|- style="background:#;"
| 66
| March 12
| Chicago
| 
|
|
|
| Amway Center
|
|- style="background:#;"
| 67
| March 15
| Charlotte
| 
|
|
|
| Amway Center
|
|- style="background:#;"
| 68
| March 17
| @ Detroit
| 
|
|
|
| Little Caesars Arena
|
|- style="background:#;"
| 69
| March 19
| Cleveland
| 
|
|
|
| Amway Center
|
|- style="background:#;"
| 70
| March 21
| Sacramento
| 
|
|
|
| Amway Center
|
|- style="background:#;"
| 71
| March 23
| @ Brooklyn
| 
|
|
|
| Barclays Center
|
|- style="background:#;"
| 72
| March 25
| Indiana
| 
|
|
|
| Amway Center
|
|- style="background:#;"
| 73
| March 27
| Brooklyn
| 
|
|
|
| Amway Center
|
|- style="background:#;"
| 74
| March 29
| New Orleans
| 
|
|
|
| Amway Center
|
|- style="background:#;"
| 75
| April 1
| Charlotte
| 
|
|
|
| Amway Center
|
|- style="background:#;"
| 76
| April 3
| @ Boston
| 
|
|
|
| TD Garden
|
|- style="background:#;"
| 77
| April 5
| @ Philadelphia
| 
|
|
|
| Wells Fargo Center
|
|- style="background:#;"
| 78
| April 8
| @ New York
| 
|
|
|
| Madison Square Garden
|
|- style="background:#;"
| 79
| April 10
| Boston
| 
|
|
|
| Amway Center
|
|- style="background:#;"
| 80
| April 11
| @ Indiana
| 
|
|
|
| Bankers Life Fieldhouse
|
|- style="background:#;"
| 81
| April 13
| @ Chicago
| 
|
|
|
| United Center
|
|- style="background:#;"
| 82
| April 15
| Toronto
| 
|
|
|
| Amway Center
|

Playoffs
As with the seeding games, all playoff games will be held without fans in attendance.

|- style="background:#cfc;"
| 1
| August 18
| @ Milwaukee
| 
| Nikola Vučević (35)
| Nikola Vučević (13)
| D. J. Augustin (11)
| HP Field House
| 1–0
|- style="background:#fcc;"
| 2
| August 20
| @ Milwaukee
| 
| Nikola Vučević (32)
| Ennis III, Vučević (10)
| D. J. Augustin (5)
| HP Field House
| 1–1
|- style="background:#fcc;"
| 3
| August 22
| Milwaukee
| 
| D. J. Augustin (24)
| Gary Clark (8)
| D. J. Augustin (6)
| HP Field House
| 1–2
|- style="background:#fcc;"
| 4
| August 24
| Milwaukee
| 
| Nikola Vučević (31)
| Nikola Vučević (11)
| Fultz, Vučević (7)
| HP Field House
| 1–3
|- style="background:#fcc;"
| 5
| August 29
| @ Milwaukee
| 
| Nikola Vučević (22)
| Nikola Vučević (15)
| Fultz, Vučević (5)
| The Arena
| 1–4

Transactions

Trades

Free agents

Re-signed

Additions

Subtractions

References

Orlando Magic seasons
Orlando Magic
Orlando Magic
Orlando Magic